Dinesh Thakor is an Indian politician from Gujarat, India. He is a member of Indian National Congress (INC). He contested in 2022 Gujarat Legislative Assembly election from Chanasma constituency as an INC candidate defeating his nearest rival and Bharatiya Janata Party candidate Dilipkumar Viraji Thakor.

References 

Living people
Gujarat MLAs 2022–2027
Indian National Congress politicians from Gujarat
Year of birth missing (living people)